One-armed versus one-legged is a form of cricket in which one team has cricketers with only one arm while the members of the other team only have one leg.

There have been several matches of this sort, held for the annual benefit of the Greenwich pensioners – sailors pensioned off from the Royal Navy and resident at the Royal Hospital for Seamen at Greenwich.  These sailors often lost limbs during naval service in the 18th century and so the teams were drawn from the ranks of the pensioners.  In 1861, Charles Dickens reported a civilian match at Peckham Rye in his magazine, All the Year Round.

Matches

1766
In 1766, two teams of Greenwich pensioners played a match at Blackheath.  The one-armed team beat the one-legged team quite handily.

1796
Two teams of Greenwich pensioners played at Aram's New Ground in Walworth for a prize of a thousand guineas.  The match was advertised and so there was a large crowd of spectators.  The teams arrived in three stagecoaches at 9 in the morning and play started at 10.  The one-legged team batted first, scoring 93 runs in that innings.  The one-armed team scored 42 runs in their first innings but there had been a great commotion while they were batting as a press of would-be spectators broke down a gate and some fencing to get in.  Some climbed on top of a stable which collapsed so they were bruised.   The one-legged team batted again and scored sixty more runs for the loss of six wickets.  The game finished that evening with the one-legged team winning by 153 runs to 42.

There was a rematch on the following Wednesday.  A one-legged batter lost his wooden leg while making a run. The leg was fielded and thrown to stump him.  This was a fine point of rules as the batter's equipment had not disturbed the wicket while making the stroke but he was still given out.  Notwithstanding this loss, the one-legged team won again by 103 runs.

The spectacle then concluded with a 100-yard dash in which the one-legged team raced for a prize pool of 20 guineas.

1841
Two teams of Greenwich pensioners played at Hall's ground in Camberwell.

1848
Two teams of Greenwich pensioners played at a ground formerly part of Lewisham Priory.  The match was organised by Messrs Ingersoll and Stanton who managed to attract two thousand, four hundred spectators who were attracted by the novelty of the event.  The game was played over two days and the teams were well-provisioned throughout, being given a hearty lunch before play and dinners of roast beef and lamb with plenty of strong ale at the Bull Inn.  A band provided music for the occasion and the cricket players were additionally rewarded with a glass of grog and a fee of ten shillings.  The one-legged men had difficulty connecting with the wide bowling, often being got out as they span around like a top.  The one-armed team was the betting favourite and won the match, scoring 50 runs in their first innings and 41 in the second.  The score of the one-legged team was 32 and 44, making the result 91 to 76 in favour of the one-armed team.

1861

Charles Dickens reported a match in his magazine, All the Year Round, having seen an advertisement in the window of a tobacconist.  It was held at Peckham Rye in the grounds of the Rosemary Branch tavern, which hosted many sporting events and pastimes.  The match was for the benefit of one of the one-armed men and the players were mostly locals but one was a well-known musical barber and dancer from Essex, who bowled for the one-legged team.  Some spectators sat on benches but Dickens sat on the roller which was used to level the pitch.  He described the spectacle as "painfully wonderful and ludicrously horrible":After much energetic play and incident, the one-armed team won by 14 runs.

1863
There was a match in Manchester where a player nicknamed "No-Legs" bowled for one team.

See also
 Blind cricket
 Deaf cricket

References

Amputee sports
Forms of cricket